Aconia Fabia Paulina (died c. 384) was an aristocratic Roman woman, the daughter of Aconius Catullinus Philomatius, who was consul in 349.  In 344 she married Vettius Agorius Praetextatus.  Paulina was initiated into the Eleusinian mysteries and was a priestess of Hecate and of the Magna Mater.

Biography 

Paulina was the daughter of Aconius Catullinus Philomatius, a prominent aristocrat who held the offices of Praefectus urbi of Rome in 342-344 and was Consul in 349. In 344, Paulina married Vettius Agorius Praetextatus, a prominent exponent of the Roman senatorial aristocracy, an important imperial officer and a member of several pagan circles; Paulina was initiated into the Eleusinian mysteries and to the Lernian mysteries of Dionysus and Demeter, was devoted to several female deities, such as Ceres, Hecate (of whom she was hierophant), the Magna Mater (as a tauroboliata) and Isis.

Praetextatus and Paulina owned at least two houses. The first was on the Esquiline Hill, probably situated between via Merulana and  viale del Monte Oppio in Rome, where the modern Palazzo Brancaccio stands. The garden around the palace, the so-called Horti Vettiani, extended to the modern Roma Termini railway station. Archaeological investigations in this area brought out several discoveries related to Praetextatus' family. Among them was the base of a statue dedicated to Coelia Concordia, one of the last Vestal Virgins, who had erected a statue in honour of Praetextatus after his death (384); in exchange for this honour Paulina dedicated a statue to Concordia. They also had a house on the Aventine Hill.

On the base of the funerary monument to Pratextatus, Paulina had a poem composed by herself inscribed, which celebrated her husband and their love, a poem probably derived by the oration read by Paulina at her husband's funeral. This poem is cited by Jerome in a letter in which he mocks Praetextatus, claiming he was not in paradise but in hell.

Paulina died shortly after her husband. Their son or daughter dedicated them a funerary monument with statues in their house.

Notes

Bibliography

Primary sources 

Secondary sources 
 Kahlos, Maijastina, "Paulina and the Death of Praetextatus", Arduum res gestas scribere
 Kahlos, Maijastina, Vettius Agorius Praetextatus. A senatorial life in between, Institutum Romanum Finlandiae, Roma, 2002,  (Acta Instituti Romani Finlandiae, 26).
 Lanciani, Rodolfo, Ancient Rome in the Light of Recent Discoveries,  Houghton & Mifflin, Boston e New York, 1898, pp. 169–170.
 Stevenson, Jane, Women Latin Poets,  Oxford University Press, 2005, pp. 71–72.
 Thayer, Bill, "Honorific Inscription of Vettius Agorius Praetextatus", Lacus Curtius

384 deaths
4th-century clergy
4th-century Latin writers
4th-century Roman poets
4th-century Roman women
4th-century women writers
Ancient Roman women writers
Ancient women poets
Late-Roman-era pagans
Fabii
Priestesses of the Roman Empire
Year of birth unknown